The Vancouver SkyTrain is a three-line urban mass transit system in the metropolitan area of Vancouver, British Columbia, Canada, managed by TransLink. The Expo Line was built for the Expo 86 World's Fair; the Millennium Line opened in 2002, followed by the Canada Line in 2009, which was built for the 2010 Winter Olympics. The Expo and Millennium Lines are operated by the British Columbia Rapid Transit Company on behalf of TransLink. The Canada Line is owned by InTransitBC, and operated by ProTrans BC, an SNC-Lavalin company. The Expo and Millennium Lines use Bombardier's Advanced Rapid Transit technology, while the Canada Line technology is provided by Hyundai Rotem. The SkyTrain is the oldest and longest fully automated driverless rapid transit system in the world.

The SkyTrain was conceived as a legacy project of Expo 86; its first line, the Expo Line, was finished in 1985, in time to showcase the fair's theme: Transportation and Communication. The line connected Vancouver with the cities of Burnaby and New Westminster, with the terminus stations at Waterfront and New Westminster station. In 1989, the line was extended one station east to Columbia station. The Skybridge, the only cable-stayed bridge built for transit use in the world, was completed in 1990, extending the Expo Line eastward to the city of Surrey with the addition of Scott Road station. The line was extended eastward again with the opening of Gateway, Surrey Central, and King George stations in 1994.

TransLink, which took over BC Transit's responsibility for the operation of the SkyTrain in 1998, proposed a two-phase expansion of the system: the first phase consisted of a  new line from New Westminster to the Broadway campus of Vancouver Community College in Vancouver via Lougheed Town Centre in Burnaby. The second phase was a $730-million extension eastward from Lougheed Town Centre to Coquitlam Centre in Coquitlam via Port Moody and another extension westward from Vancouver Community College to Granville Street via the Broadway corridor. The expansion line, now known as the Millennium Line, began operating in 2002. The line connected to the Expo Line at Columbia and originally added eleven new stations to the system; the twelfth, Lake City Way, opened in 2003. The Millennium Line's thirteenth station and current western terminus, VCC–Clark, opened in 2006. The second phase was subsequently cancelled, later revived and eventually branded the Evergreen Extension. The extension opened in 2016, expanding service into Coquitlam via Burnaby and Port Moody with 6 new stations, adding  to the existing Millennium Line. The extension stretches from Lougheed Town Centre station to Lafarge Lake–Douglas station, which is located beside Lafarge Lake and across from the David Lam campus of Douglas College in Coquitlam City Centre.

In 2004, TransLink approved a  line connecting Vancouver with Richmond and the Vancouver International Airport (YVR). The line, now known as the Canada Line, opened in 2009, a few months ahead of the 2010 Olympics. The line added 15 stations to the system, and has two branches that split off at Bridgeport; one branch heads south to the city of Richmond, while the other heads west toward the main terminal at YVR.

There are 53 stations on the SkyTrain system. 20 stations are served exclusively by the Expo Line, 14 exclusively by the Millennium Line, 15 exclusively by the Canada Line, 1 by both the Expo and Canada Lines, and 3 by both the Expo and Millennium Lines. Vancouver and Burnaby have a total of 31 stations, 20 and 11 respectively, consisting of 58 percent of the system's stations. Commercial–Broadway was originally two separate stations—Broadway station and Commercial Drive station; Broadway was completed with the Expo Line, while Commercial Drive was completed with the Millennium Line. The stations combined in 2009 in order to avoid confusion with Broadway–City Hall. From the Millennium Line's start of operation in 2002 until 2016, all Expo Line stations outside of Surrey were also serviced by the Millennium Line until TransLink changed the operating patterns of both lines. Since 2016, Braid and Sapperton have been serviced by the Expo Line instead of the Millennium Line via a branch from Columbia heading north towards Production Way–University, a major bus transfer point for Simon Fraser University's Burnaby campus. The Millennium Line heads east from VCC–Clark to Larfarge Lake–Douglas, connecting with the Expo Line at Production Way–University and Lougheed Town Centre stations. Waterfront is the terminus for both the Expo and Canada Lines. Richmond–Brighouse and YVR–Airport are the outbound terminuses for the two Canada Line branches.

Key

Stations

Future stations

Notes

References
General
 

Specific

 
Lists of metro stations
SkyTrain stations
Lists of railway stations in Canada
Lists of buildings and structures in British Columbia